XHCHG-FM 102.7/XECHG-AM 680 is a combo radio station in Chilpancingo, Guerrero. It is owned by Grupo Audiorama Comunicaciones and known as Súper 102.7 with a pop format.

History

XECHG received its first concession on April 26, 1991. It was owned by Radiorama subsidiary Radio Signo, S.A.

In 1994, XECHG added an FM counterpart, XHCHG-FM on 97.9 MHz. In July 2004, XHCHG was authorized to move from 97.9 to 107.1. XHCHG moved again to 102.7 MHz on April 12, 2019, as a condition of the renewal of its concession, in order to clear 106-108 MHz as much as possible for community and indigenous stations.

References

Radio stations in Guerrero
Radio stations established in 1991